William Gerald "Earthquake" Smith (October 23, 1926 – September 6, 2009) was an American football player who played at the tackle and end positions. A native of Lexington, North Carolina, he attended Lexington High School. He played college football for North Carolina in 1944 and 1947. He served in the military during World War II. He was selected by the Chicago Cardinals in the third round (23rd overall pick) of the 1948 NFL Draft. He did not play for the Cardinals, opting instead to play in the All-America Football Conference for the Chicago Rockets and Los Angeles Dons during the 1948 season. He appeared in two games for the Rockets and 10 or 11 games for the Dons.

References

1926 births
2009 deaths
Chicago Rockets players
Los Angeles Dons players
North Carolina Tar Heels football players
Players of American football from North Carolina
People from Lexington, North Carolina